The Tamil Nadu Legislative Assembly is the unicameral legislature of the Indian state of Tamil Nadu. It has a strength of 234 members of whom are democratically elected using the First-past-the-post system. The presiding officer of the Assembly is the Speaker. The term of the Assembly is five years unless dissolved earlier.

Since Tamil Nadu has a unicameral legislature, the terms Tamil Nadu Legislature and Tamil Nadu Legislative Assembly are almost synonymous and are often confused. However, they are not one and the same. The Tamil Nadu Legislature is the legislative body while the Tamil Nadu Legislative Assembly is a part of it. The Tamil Nadu Legislative Assembly, along with the Governor of Tamil Nadu, constitutes the Tamil Nadu Legislature.

The present state of Tamil Nadu is a residuary part of the erstwhile Madras Presidency and was formerly known as Madras State. The first legislature of any sort for the Presidency was the Madras Legislative Council which was set up as a non-representative advisory body in 1861. In 1919, direct elections were introduced with the introduction of Diarchy under the Government of India Act 1919. Between 1920–1937, the Legislative Council was a unicameral legislature for the Madras Presidency. The Government of India Act 1935 abolished diarchy and created a bicameral legislature in the Madras Presidency. The Legislative Assembly became the Lower House of the Presidency.

After the Republic of India was established in 1950, the Madras Presidency became the Madras State and the bicameral setup continued. The Madras State's assembly strength was 375 and the first assembly was constituted in 1952. The current state was formed in 1956 after the reorganization of states and the strength of the assembly was reduced to 206. Its strength was increased to the present 234 in 1965. Madras State was renamed Tamil Nadu in 1969 and subsequently, the assembly came to be called the "Tamil Nadu Legislative Assembly". The Legislative Council was abolished in 1986, making the legislature a unicameral body and the assembly its sole chamber.

The present Sixteenth Legislative Assembly was constituted on May 2, 2021. It was constituted after the 2021 assembly election, which resulted in the Dravida Munnetra Kazhagam (DMK) led front winning and forming the government. The next election will take place in 2026.

History

Origin

The first Legislature of any kind to be established in Madras was the Madras Legislative Council in 1861. First established as a non-representative advisory body, it saw the introduction of elected members in 1892. The Indian Councils Act 1909 (popularly called as "Minto-Morley Reforms"), officially introduced indirect election of members to the Council. In 1919, direct elections were introduced with the introduction of Diarchy under the Government of India Act 1919. Between 1920–1937, the Legislative Council was a unicameral legislature for the Madras Presidency. The Government of India Act 1935 abolished diarchy and created a bicameral legislature in the Madras province. The Legislature consisted of the Governor and two Legislative bodies – a Legislative Assembly and a Legislative Council. The Assembly was the lower house and consisted of 215 members, who were further classified into general members and reserved members representing special communities and interests:

The presiding officer of the Assembly was called the Speaker of the Assembly.

The Assembly in Madras Presidency

The first legislative assembly election for the Presidency was held in February 1937. The Indian National Congress obtained a majority by winning 159 of 215 seats. C. Rajagopalachari became the first elected chief minister of the Presidency under the provincial autonomy system guaranteed by the Government of India Act 1935. The first assembly was constituted in July 1937. Bulusu Sambamurti and A. Rukmani Lakshmipathi were elected as the Speaker and Deputy Speaker respectively.

The first assembly lasted its term until February 1943, but the Congress cabinet resigned in October 1939, protesting India's participation in World War II. During 1939–46, Madras was under the direct rule of the Governor and no elections were held in 1943 when the assembly's term expired. Next elections were held only in 1946, when a political compromise was reached between the Congress and viceroy Lord Wavell. The second assembly of the presidency was constituted in April 1946 and J. Shivashanmugam Pillai was elected as the speaker. The Congress won an absolute majority in the elections and again formed the Government. On 15 August 1947, India became independent and the new Indian Constitution came into effect on 26 January 1950. Madras Presidency became Madras State and the existing assembly and the Government were retained till new elections could be held in 1951.

The Assembly in Republic of India

In the Republic of India, the Madras State Legislative Assembly continued to be the lower house in a bicameral legislature. The first election to the assembly on the basis of universal adult suffrage was held in January 1952. According to the Delimitation of Parliamentary and Assembly Constituencies (Madras) Order, 1951, made by the President under sections 6 and 9 of the Representation of the People Act, 1950, the assembly's strength was 375 members elected from 309 constituencies. Out of the 309 constituencies in the undivided Madras State, 66 were two member constituencies, 62 of which had one seat reserved for Scheduled Caste candidates and 4 for Scheduled Tribe candidates. The two member constituencies were established in accordance to Article 332 of the Indian Constitution. The voting method and the plurality electoral formula were defined in The Representation of People Act, 1950. These constituencies were larger in size and had greater number of voters (more than 1,00,000) when compared to general constituencies. Multiple members were elected only in the 1952 and 1957 elections as double member representation was abolished in 1961 by the enactment of Two-Member Constituencies Abolition Act (1961). Of the 375 seats, 143 were from what later became Andhra state, 29 were from Malabar, 11 from South Canara (part of present-day Karnataka) and the remaining 190 belonged to Tamil Nadu.

On 1 October 1953, a separate Andhra State consisting of the Telugu-speaking areas of the composite Madras State was formed and the Kannada-speaking area of Bellary District was merged with the then Mysore State. This reduced the strength of the Legislative Assembly to 231. On 1 November 1956, the States Reorganisation Act took effect and consequently the constituencies in the erstwhile Malabar District were merged with the Kerala State. This further reduced the strength to 190. The Tamil-speaking area of Kerala (present day Kanyakumari district) and Sengottai taluk were added to Madras State. According to the new Delimitation of Parliamentary and Assembly Constituencies Order 1956, made by the Delimitation Commission of India under the provisions of the State Reorganisation Act of 1956, the strength of the assembly was increased to 205.

The 1957 elections were conducted for these 205 seats. In 1959, as result of The Andhra Pradesh and Madras (Alteration of Boundaries) Act 1959, one member from the Andhra Pradesh Legislative Assembly was allotted to Madras increasing its Legislative Assembly strength to 206. The 1962 elections were conducted for these 206 seats. In 1965, the elected strength of the assembly was increased to 234 by the Delimitation of Parliamentary and Assembly Constituencies Order, 1965. In addition to the 234, the assembly also has one nominated member representing the Anglo-Indian community. From 1965, the number of members has remained constant. In 1969, Madras State was renamed Tamil Nadu and subsequently the assembly came to be known as the "Tamil Nadu Legislative Assembly". The Legislative Council was abolished with effect from 1 November 1986 through an Act of Parliament titled as The Tamil Nadu Legislative Council (Abolition) Act, 1986. With the abolition of the council, the legislature became a unicameral body and remained so for the next 24 years. Of the fourteen assemblies that have been constituted so far, four (the sixth, seventh, ninth and tenth) have been dismissed by the Central Government using Article 356 of the Indian Constitution. 
This State Assembly is unique because, since 1991, the actual leader of the Official Opposition party, if he/she is an official member of the house will not attend the house proceedings.

Location

The Legislative Assembly is seated at the Fort St. George, Chennai. Fort St. George has historically been the seat of the Government of Tamil Nadu since colonial times. During 1921–37, the precursor to the assembly – Madras Legislative Council, met at the council chambers within the fort. Between 14 July 1937 – 21 December 1938, the assembly met at the Senate House of the University of Madras and between 27 January 1938 – 26 October 1939 in the Banqueting Hall (later renamed as Rajaji Hall) in the Government Estate complex at Mount Road. During 1946–52, it moved back to the Fort St. George. In 1952, the strength of the assembly rose to 375, after the constitution of the first assembly, and it was briefly moved into temporary premises at the government estate complex. This move was made in March 1952, as the existing assembly building only had a seating capacity of 260. Then on 3 May 1952, it moved into the newly constructed assembly building in the same complex. The assembly functioned from the new building (later renamed as "Kalaivanar Arangam") during 1952–56. However, with the reorganisation of states and formation of Andhra, the strength came down to 190 and the assembly moved back to Fort St. George in 1956. From December 1956 till January 2010, the Fort remained the home to the assembly.

In 2004, during the 12th assembly, the AIADMK Government under J. Jayalalithaa made unsuccessful attempts to shift the assembly, first to the location of Queen Mary's College and later to the Anna University campus, Guindy. Both attempts were withdrawn after public opposition. During the 13th Assembly, the DMK government led by M. Karunanidhi proposed a new plan to shift the assembly and the government secretariat to a new building in the Omandurar Government Estate. In 2007, the German architectural firm GMP International won the design competition to design and construct the new assembly complex. Construction began in 2008 and was completed in 2010. The new assembly building was opened and the assembly started functioning in it from March 2010. After AIADMK's victory in the 2011 elections, the assembly shifted back to Fort St. George.

List of historical locations where the Tamil Nadu Legislature has been housed:

List of the assemblies

 Note: In the 1952 election, no party achieved a majority in the assembly election, so C. Rajagopalachari became the first and only non-elected Chief Minister. In the 1967 election, C. N. Annadurai was elected to the Lok Sabha and not to the Assembly. He resigned his as Member of Parliament and was elected to the Legislative Council to become Chief Minister.

Committees

Composition

Members of Legislative Assembly

Portraits in the assembly chamber

The bust of P. Rajagopalachari and L. D. Swamikannu Pillai, former presidents of Madras Legislative Council adorns the assembly lobby.

See also 
 Elections in Tamil Nadu
 Government of Tamil Nadu
 List of chief ministers of Tamil Nadu
 List of speakers of the Tamil Nadu Legislative Assembly

Notes

References

External links
 Tamil Nadu Lok Sabha Election 2019 Result Website
Slideshow of historical images of the Tamil Nadu Legislature

 
Government of Tamil Nadu